D. brassicae may refer to:

 Dasineura brassicae, an agricultural pest insect
 Diplodia brassicae, an anamorphic fungus
 Dothiorella brassicae, a sac fungus